"There's Been a Change in Me" is a 1951 song written by Cy Coben and performed by Eddy Arnold.  The song went to number one on the Country & Western Best Seller chart for four weeks and spent a total of twenty-three weeks on the chart.

References
 

 
 

1951 songs
Eddy Arnold songs
Songs written by Cy Coben